Ali Tajvidi (November 7, 1919 – March 15, 2006) was an Iranian musician, composer, violinist, songwriter, and music professor at the School of National Music and Tehran University. He composed more than 150 songs and discovered and produced for many Persian performers such as Delkash and Hayedeh. 
He was born in Tehran, where his father was active as a painter in the style of Kamal-ol-Molk. In his youth he took violin lessons for two years under Hossein Yahaghi (uncle of Parviz Yahaghi) and for many years was under the tutelage of Abol-Hassan Saba for the violin as well. also took Harmony lessons under Houshang Ostovar.

After 1941, having developed his violin technique considerably, Tajvidi performed regularly as a violin soloist in Radio Iran programs. In later years, he conducted two orchestras, for which he wrote numerous compositions. Asheqi Sheyda, Be Yad-e Saba, Atash-e Karevan, Didi ke Rosva Shod Delam, and Sang-e Khara are among his best known works. He wrote a three-volume book, entitled "Persian Music", which has been released by the Soroush Publishing Company. In 1978 the Iranian government acknowledged his musical accomplishments by awarding him the highest artistic medal that they dispense.

During his career Tajvidi cooperated with outstanding contemporary artists including Delkash, Gholamhossein Banan, Hossein Qavami, Mahmoud Mahmoudi-Khansari, Akbar Golpaygani, Hossein Khajeh Amiri (a.k.a. Iraj), Jalil Shahnaz, Farhang Sharif, Habibollah Badiei, Parviz Yahaghi, Javad Maroufi, Faramarz Payvar, Mehdi Khaledi, Homayoun Khorram. Homeira, a noted singer, first became famous by the song (sabram ata kon) which was composed by Ali Tajvidi. Tajvidi also composed some songs that he played solo on the violin. He is regarded as one of the best violinists in Iran, on a par with Parviz Yahaghi. He also played the Setar. He made Radif which concerns the traditional music of Iran: maghami or dhastgahi for the violin.

Famous Album 
Yade ostad with Alireza Eftekhari

References

External links
 Ali Tajvidi Biography On BBC Persian
 Photograph of the graveside of Ali Tajvidi in Behesht-e Zahra, Tehran: Zahirdowleh.com

1919 births
2006 deaths
Burials at artist's block of Behesht-e Zahra
Iranian composers
Iranian violinists
Musicians from Tehran
20th-century violinists
Iranian Science and Culture Hall of Fame recipients in Music